William Darby may refer to:
William Darby (priest), Anglican archdeacon in Ireland
William J. Darby (1913–2001), American physician and nutrition scientist
William Orlando Darby, US Army officer
USAT General William O. Darby
Pablo Fanque (born William Darby), British equestrian performer and circus proprietor

See also

William Derby (disambiguation)